True Grit is a 1968 novel by Charles Portis that was first published as a 1968 serial in The Saturday Evening Post. The novel is told from the perspective of a woman named Mattie Ross, who recounts the time when she was 14 and sought retribution for the murder of her father by a scoundrel, Tom Chaney.  It is considered by some critics to be "one of the great American novels."

The novel was adapted for the screenplay of the 1969 film True Grit starring John Wayne, Kim Darby and Glen Campbell.  Six years later, in 1975, Wayne reprised his Academy Award-winning role as the tough hard drinking one-eyed lawman in the sequel film Rooster Cogburn.  In 2010, Joel and Ethan Coen wrote and directed another film adaptation of True Grit.  In November 2010, The Overlook Press published a movie tie-in edition of the second film version of  True Grit.

Plot summary
The novel is narrated by Mattie Ross, churchgoing elderly spinster distinguished by intelligence, independence, and strength of mind. She recounts the story of her adventures fifty years earlier, in 1878, when she undertook a quest to avenge her father's murder by a drifter named Tom Chaney. She is joined on her quest by Marshal Reuben J. "Rooster" Cogburn and a Texas Ranger named LaBoeuf (pronounced "La-beef").

As Mattie's tale begins, Chaney is employed on the Ross's family farm in West-Central Arkansas, near the town of Dardanelle in Yell County. Chaney is not adept as a farmhand, and Mattie has only scorn for him, referring to him as "trash" and noting that her kind-hearted father, Frank, hired him only out of pity. One day, Frank Ross and Chaney go to Fort Smith to buy some horses. Ross takes $250 with him to pay for the horses, along with two gold pieces that he has always carried, but he ends up spending only $100 on the horses. Later, Ross tries to intervene in a barroom confrontation involving Chaney. Chaney kills him, robs the body of the remaining $150 and two gold pieces, and flees into Indian Territory (now Oklahoma) on his horse.

Mattie hears that Chaney has joined an outlaw gang led by the infamous "Lucky" Ned Pepper and wishes to track down the killer. Upon arriving at Fort Smith, she looks for the toughest deputy US Marshal in the district. That man turns out to be Reuben J. "Rooster" Cogburn, an aging, one-eyed, overweight, trigger-happy, hard-drinking man. Mattie is convinced that he has "grit" and that his reputation for violence makes him best suited for the job.

Playing on Cogburn's need for money, Mattie persuades him to take on the job, insisting that she accompany him as part of the bargain. During their preparation, a Texas Ranger named LaBoeuf appears. He has been tracking Chaney for four months for killing a senator and his dog in Texas, and he hopes to bring him back to Texas dead or alive for a cash reward. Cogburn and LaBoeuf take a dislike to each other, but after some haggling, they agree to join forces in the hunt, realizing that they can both benefit from each other's respective talents and knowledge. Once they reach a deal, the two men attempt to leave Mattie behind, but she proves more tenacious than they had expected. They repeatedly try to lose her, but she persists in following them and seeing her transaction with Marshal Cogburn through to the end. Eventually, she is jumped by Cogburn and LaBoeuf, who had hidden themselves from view, and LaBoeuf begins to whip Mattie with a switch. Mattie appeals to Cogburn, and he orders LaBoeuf to stop. At this point, Mattie is allowed to join their posse.

Together, but with very different motivations, the three ride into the wilderness to confront Ned Pepper's gang. Along the way, they develop an appreciation for one another.

Film and television adaptations
In 1969, the book was adapted as a screenplay  by Marguerite Roberts for the Western film True Grit directed by Henry Hathaway and starring Kim Darby as Mattie Ross, Robert Duvall as "Lucky" Ned Pepper, Glen Campbell as LaBoeuf, Jeff Corey as Tom Chaney, and John Wayne as Rooster Cogburn (a role that won John Wayne Best Actor at the Academy Awards).

A film sequel, Rooster Cogburn, was produced from an original screenplay in 1975, with John Wayne reprising his role, and Katharine Hepburn as an elderly spinster, Eula Goodnight, who teams with him. The sequel was not well received, and the plot was considered a needless reworking of the plot of True Grit combined with elements of The African Queen.

A made-for-television sequel aired in 1978 entitled True Grit: A Further Adventure and starring Warren Oates and Lisa Pelikan. The TV-movie featured more adventures of Rooster Cogburn and Mattie Ross.

In 2010, Joel and Ethan Coen released another film adaptation of the novel, also entitled True Grit, with thirteen-year-old actress Hailee Steinfeld as Mattie Ross, veteran actor Jeff Bridges playing Rooster Cogburn, Matt Damon as LaBoeuf, Barry Pepper as Lucky Ned, and Josh Brolin as Tom Chaney.  Their version, focusing on Mattie's point of view, follows the novel more closely than the 1969 film. The Coen movie is shot in settings more typical of the novel. (The 1969 film was shot in the Colorado Rockies and the Sierra Nevada, while the 2010 film was shot in Santa Fe, New Mexico as well as Granger and Austin, Texas.) 

In November 2010, The Overlook Press published a movie tie-in edition of True Grit, featuring an afterword by Donna Tartt to accompany the 2010 film adaptation. It reached #1 on The New York Times's Bestseller List on January 30, 2011.

References

Further reading

Nauenberg, William. (2020). "True Grit by Charles Portis". The Objective Standard. Summer 2020.

 
1968 American novels
Western (genre) novels
Novels by Charles Portis
Works originally published in The Saturday Evening Post
Novels first published in serial form
Novels set in Arkansas
Novels set in Oklahoma
American novels adapted into films
United States Marshals Service in fiction
First-person narrative novels
Yell County, Arkansas